Kostomłoty  is a village (former city) in Środa Śląska County, Lower Silesian Voivodeship, in south-western Poland. It is the seat of the administrative district (gmina) called Gmina Kostomłoty.

The village has a population of 830.

In 2015, the first Tesla Supercharger in Poland was opened in the village.

References

Villages in Środa Śląska County
Former populated places in Lower Silesian Voivodeship